The Trofeo Pantalica was a professional road bicycle race held annually in Province of Syracuse, Italy. The last edition took place in 2003.

Winners

External links
List of winners by memoire-du-cyclisme.net 

Defunct cycling races in Italy
Cycle races in Italy
Recurring sporting events established in 1975
1975 establishments in Italy
Recurring sporting events disestablished in 2003
Men's road bicycle races
2003 disestablishments in Italy